Ivar Skarland (September 2, 1899 – January 1, 1965) was a Norwegian anthropologist.

Skarland was born in Høylandet, Norway, on September 2, 1899. He earned a diploma from the Steinkjer School of Forestry in Norway in 1921 before moving to the United States for further education. He studied English at the Alaska Agricultural College and School of Mines, graduating in 1935. In 1942, he was awarded a master's degree in Anthropology from Harvard University and in 1948 received a Ph.D. from the same institution. He was a student of Earnest Hooton. He worked with Otto W. Geist.

Works
 The Geography and Archaeology of Alaska in Pleistocene and Early Post-glacial Time (1949)

References

External links
 The geography and archaeology of Alaska in Pleistocene and early post-glacial time Manuscript at Dartmouth College Library

1889 births
1965 deaths
Harvard University alumni
Norwegian anthropologists
University of Alaska Fairbanks alumni
University of Alaska Fairbanks faculty
20th-century anthropologists
People from Høylandet